John Gilroy may refer to:

 John Gilroy (artist) (1898–1985), English artist/illustrator known for Guinness advertisements
 John Gilroy (baseball) (1875–1897), baseball player
 John Gilroy (film editor) (born 1959), brother of Tony Gilroy
 John Gilroy (politician) (born 1967), Irish Labour Party Senator
 John Brodie Gilroy (1818–1853), English songwriter
 Johnny Gilroy (1896–1952), American football halfback
 John Gilroy (pioneer),  19th century Royal Navy sailor who was the namesake of the city of Gilroy, California